Sculptassiminea is a genus of gastropods belonging to the family Assimineidae.

The species of this genus are found in Southeastern Asia.

Species:

Sculptassiminea abbotti 
Sculptassiminea microsculpta  (synonym: Assiminea microsculpta G.Nevill, 1880)
Sculptassiminea spiralis

References

Assimineidae